The Piano Concerto No. 20 in D minor, K. 466, was composed by Wolfgang Amadeus Mozart in 1785. The first performance took place at the Mehlgrube Casino in Vienna on 11 February 1785, with the composer as the soloist.

Background
A few days after the first performance, the composer's father, Leopold, visiting in Vienna, wrote to his daughter Nannerl about her brother's recent success: "[I heard] an excellent new piano concerto by Wolfgang, on which the copyist was still at work when we got here, and your brother didn't even have time to play through the rondo because he had to oversee the copying operation."

It is written in the key of D minor. Other works by the composer in that key include the Fantasia K. 397 for piano, the Requiem, a Kyrie, a mass, the aria "Der Hölle Rache kocht in meinem Herzen" from the opera The Magic Flute and parts of the opera Don Giovanni. It is the first of two piano concertos written in a minor key (No. 24 in C minor being the other).

The young Ludwig van Beethoven admired this concerto and kept it in his repertoire. Composers who wrote cadenzas for it include Beethoven (WoO 58), Franz Xaver Wolfgang Mozart, Charles-Valentin Alkan, Johannes Brahms (WoO 14), Johann Nepomuk Hummel, Ferruccio Busoni, and Clara Schumann.

One of Mozart's favorite pianos that he played while he was living in Vienna had a pedal-board that was operated with the feet, like that of an organ.
This piano that Mozart owned is on display at Mozart House in Salzburg, but currently it has no pedal-board. The fact that Mozart had a piano with a pedal-board is reported in a letter written by his father, Leopold, who visited his son while he lived in Vienna. Among Mozart's piano works, none are explicitly written with a part for a pedal-board. However, according to Leopold's report, at the first performance of Piano Concerto No. 20 in D Minor (K. 466), Mozart, who was the soloist and conductor, used his own piano, equipped with a pedal-board. Presumably the pedal-board was used to reinforce the left-hand part, or add lower notes than the standard keyboard could play. Because Mozart was also an expert on the organ, operating a pedal-board with his feet was no harder than using only his hands.

Movements 
The concerto is scored for solo piano, flute, two oboes, two bassoons, two horns, two trumpets, timpani and strings.

As is typical with concertos, it is in three movements:

I. Allegro 
The first movement starts off the concerto in the dark tonic key of D minor with the strings restlessly but quietly building up to a full forte.

The theme is quickly taken up by the piano soloist and developed throughout the long movement. A slightly brighter mood exists in the second theme of F major (the relative major), but it never becomes jubilant. The timpani further heighten the tension in the coda before the cadenza. The movement ends on a quiet note.

II. Romanze 
The Romanze second movement, in B major, is a five-part rondo (ABACA) with a coda. The trumpets and timpani are not used in this movement. The beginning features a solo piano playing the flamboyant and charming main B major melody without accompaniment. This lyrical, passionate, tender and romantic melody paints a picture of peace and a sense of harmony between the piano and the orchestra and has also inspired its title 'Romanze'.

Halfway through, the piece moves on to the second episode (part C), where instead of the beautiful melody, a storm sets in. The new stormy material is a turbulent, agitated and ominous theme, in the relative key of G minor, which greatly contrasts with the peaceful mood at the starting of the movement. Though the storm section begins abruptly and without transition, after a transition back to the tonic key of B major we are greeted once again with the previously heard melody, which returns as the movement is nearing its end. The movement ends with an ascending arpeggio that is light and delicate, gradually becoming a faint whisper.

III. Rondo, Allegro assai 
The final movement, a rondo, begins with the solo piano rippling upward in the home key before the full orchestra replies with a furious section. (This piano "rippling" is known as the Mannheim Rocket and is a string of eighth notes (D-F-A-D-F) followed by a quarter note (A). A second melody is touched upon by the piano, where the mood is still dark but strangely restless. A contrasting cheerful melody in F major is ushered in not long after, introduced by the orchestra before the solo piano rounds off the lively theme. A series of sharp piano chords snaps the bright melody, and then begin passages in D minor for solo piano again, afterwards taken up by full orchestra. Several modulations of the second theme (in A minor and G minor) follow. Thereafter follows the same format as above, with a momentary pause for introducing the customary cadenza.

After the cadenza, the mood clears considerably and the piece is now fully sunny in character, as we are now in the parallel key of D major, and the bright happy melody is taken up, this time by the oboes and then winds. The solo piano repeats the theme before a full orchestral passage develops the passage, thereby rounding up the concerto with a jubilant finish.

In other media

The 1984 feature film Amadeus makes use of the first movement for a scene where Mozart is stumbling home after an evening with Emanuel Schikaneder during a night of composing the score of his opera The Magic Flute.The second movement (minus the more tumultuous C part of the rondo) plays in the final scene and during the end credits.

The first movement was played in the ballet scene in Series 1 Episode 8 of the television series Mr. Robot. The first movement was also heard in American composer James Hewitt’s Medley Overture in D minor-major .

References

Sources 
 Girdlestone, C. M. Mozart's Piano Concertos. Cassell, London.
 Hutchings, A. A Companion to Mozart's Piano Concertos,  Oxford University Press.
 Mozart, W. A. Piano Concertos Nos. 17-22 in full score.  Dover Publications, New York.
 Steinberg, M. The Concerto: A Listener's Guide, Oxford (1998)

External links 

BBC Discovering Music (browse for .ram file for this work)

20
Compositions in D minor
1785 compositions